Giuseppe Tarella (Turin, May 17, 1883 – January 17, 1968) was an Italian athlete. He competed at the 1908 Summer Olympics in London.

Biography
In the 400 metres event, Tarella finished fourth in his three-man preliminary heat and did not advance to the semifinals.

Achievements

See also
Italy at the 1908 Summer Olympics

Notes

References

External links
 

1883 births
1968 deaths
Sportspeople from Turin
Italian male sprinters
Olympic athletes of Italy
Athletes (track and field) at the 1908 Summer Olympics